3 Dancing Slaves (French: Le Clan) is a 2004 French film directed by Gaël Morel.

Plot
Annecy is no tourist destination for three working-class brothers and their father, in the months after their mother has died. Marc (Nicolas Cazalé) is deeply troubled: he tries to stiff drug dealers and then plots revenge. Christophe (Stéphane Rideau) is released from jail, lands a job, and must overcome various temptations in order to keep it. Olivier (Thomas Dumerchez), nearing 18, may be falling in love with Hicham (Salim Kechiouche), a young man who regularly practises capoeira on the shores of the lake. Both violence and fraternity are close to the surface of most interactions. How each brother emerges from his challenge comprises the film's drama. The film discusses how these men can form a family.

Cast
Nicolas Cazalé as Marc
Stéphane Rideau as Christophe
 as Olivier
Salim Kechiouche as Hicham
Bruno Lochet as the father
 as "Professeur"
Jackie Berroyer as Robert
Aure Atika as Emilie
Nicolas Paz as Montana
Mathias Olivier as Ryan
Gary Mary as Luc
Geordie Piseri-Diaz as Jérémy
Clément Dettli as Henry
Pierre Vallin as Sly
Janine Ribollet as Sly's mother

References

External links

French drama films
Gay-related films
2004 films
French LGBT-related films
LGBT-related drama films
2004 drama films

2004 LGBT-related films
2000s French films